Pilocrocis cryptalis is a moth in the family Crambidae. It was described by Herbert Druce in 1895. It is found in Honduras, Costa Rica, Panama and French Guiana.

The forewings and hindwings are purplish black, the former with five semihyaline pearly-white spots. The base of the hindwings is white, as is a broken band about the middle.

References

Pilocrocis
Moths described in 1895
Moths of Central America
Moths of South America